Leonardo De Lorenzo (August 29, 1875 – July 29, 1962) was an Italian virtuoso flutist and music educator.

Biography
Born at Viggiano, in the province of Potenza, De Lorenzo started playing the flute at the age of 8 and went to Naples to attend the Music conservatory "San Pietro a Majella". At 16, he moved to the United States, working at a hotel in Cerulean, Kentucky, but in 1896 he returned to Italy for the military service in Alessandria, becoming a member of a military band directed by Giovanni Moranzoni.

Subsequently, he began his own career and toured in Italy, Germany, England and South Africa. He joined an orchestra in Cape Town at 25. In 1907, he returned to Naples to complete the studies, then he went to America again, becoming first flautist of the New York Philharmonic Orchestra, directed by Gustav Mahler, and played with the New York Symphony Orchestra, in substitution of Georges Barrère.

He was also flautist of the orchestras of Minneapolis, Los Angeles and Rochester. In 1914, during his collaboration with the Minneapolis Symphony Orchestra, he met Maude Peterson, a pianist who frequently accompanied him and became his wife. In 1917, the Los Angeles Flute Club played a musical in his honor and De Lorenzo was appointed the first Honorary Member of the association.

From 1923 to 1935 he was professor for flute at the Eastman School of Music, where one of his students was Julius Baker, considered one of the greatest American flutist of his generation. After his retirement, De Lorenzo focused on composition and writing of theoretical publications. Works such as Saltarello and Pizzica-pizzica are a homage to the characteristic sounds of the traditional music of his native town. In 1951 he released the book My complete story of the flute, a result of intensive research by De Lorenzo which made him one of the most eminent flute pedagogues of the 20th century.

All of his research material was donated to the University of Southern California, on October 25, 1953. In the same year, he received an honorary doctorate of the Washington International Academy of Rome and was godfather for the newly formed flute club in Milan. On August 29, 1955 the Los Angeles Flute Club organized a concert playing his compositions for his 80th birthday. De Lorenzo died in his home in Santa Barbara, California. The International Flute Competition "Leonardo De Lorenzo", held every two years in Viggiano from 1997 to 2013, was dedicated to him.

Compositions
 Appassionato, for flute, op. 5
 Giovialità, for flute and piano, op. 15
 Serenata, for flute and piano, op. 16
 2 Pieces for flute and piano, op.17
 2 Pieces for flute and piano, op.18
 2 Pieces for flute and piano, op.19
 2 Pieces for flute and piano, op.20
 2 Pieces for flute and piano, op.21
 2 Pieces for flute and piano, op.22
 2 Pieces for flute and piano, op.23
 Saltarello, for flute, op. 27
 Carnevale di Venezia, for flute
 Nove grandi studi
 I tre virtuosi, for three flutes, op. 31
 I seguaci di Pan, for four flutes, op. 32
 Non plus ultra, for flute, op. 34
 Pizzica-Pizzica, for flute, op. 37
 Suite mitologica, for flute, op. 38
 Idillio, for flute and piano, op. 67
 Improvviso, for flute and piano, op. 72
 Sinfonietta (Divertimento Flautistico), for five flutes, op. 75
 Trio Eccentrico, for flute, clarinet and bassoon, op. 76
 Trio Romantico, for flute, oboe and clarinet, op. 78
 I quattro virtuosi (Divertimento fantastico), for flute, oboe, clarinet and bassoon, op. 80
 Capriccio, for four flutes, op. 82

Didactic works
L'Indispensabile. A complete modern school for the flute (1912)
My complete story of the flute (1951)

External links

  
 
 Biography of Leonardo De Lorenzo
 Biography of Leonardo De Lorenzo
 Official site of the International Flute Competition "Leonardo De Lorenzo"

1875 births
1962 deaths
People from Viggiano
Musicians from Santa Barbara, California
Italian classical flautists
Italian music educators
Eastman School of Music faculty